Beare may refer to:

Places
 Beare, village in Devon, England
 Beare Green, village in Surrey, England
 Beare Sound, Nunavut, Canada
 Beara Peninsula, County Cork, Ireland

Other uses
 Beare (surname)
 Beare Head engine
 J & A Beare, violin dealers